Monique Kalkman-Van den Bosch (born 28 November 1964) is a Dutch former professional wheelchair tennis and table tennis player. Monique competed at the Paralympics in 1984, 1988, 1992 and 1996. In 2017, she was inducted into the International Tennis Hall of Fame.

Biography 
Monique Van den Bosch was diagnosed with cancer due to paraplegia when she was just 14 years old. Initially she took the sport of table tennis during her childhood age before becoming a professional wheelchair tennis player. At the age of 20, she made her Paralympic debut during the 1984 Summer Paralympics and competed in the table tennis events.

Career 
Monique Kalkman clinched a gold and a bronze medal in the women's table tennis competitions as a part of the 1984 Summer Paralympics. She then competed at the 1988 Summer Paralympics as a wheelchair tennis player and claimed a gold medal in the women's singles though the event was a demonstration sport at the 1988 Summer Paralympics. Monique Van den Bosch continued her medal hunt at the Summer Paralympics as she claimed gold medals in the women's singles and women's doubles partnering with Chantal Vandierendonck at the 1992 Summer Paralympics.

She also won the ITF World Titles in 1992, 1993, 1994 and 1995.

Post career 
In 1997, she was advised by the doctors to play golf as she had paraplegia disease. She retired from playing wheelchair tennis championships in 1997 and started to play golf during her leisure times. She also founded the Going4Golf, a golf foundation which aims to promote the golf sport for people with disabilities.

References

External links

1964 births
Living people
Dutch female tennis players
Dutch female table tennis players
Table tennis players at the 1984 Summer Paralympics
Wheelchair tennis players at the 1988 Summer Paralympics
Wheelchair tennis players at the 1992 Summer Paralympics
Wheelchair tennis players at the 1996 Summer Paralympics
Paralympic medalists in table tennis
Paralympic medalists in wheelchair tennis
Paralympic gold medalists for the Netherlands
Paralympic silver medalists for the Netherlands
Paralympic table tennis players of the Netherlands
Paralympic wheelchair tennis players of the Netherlands
People with paraplegia
People from Sint-Oedenrode
International Tennis Hall of Fame inductees
Medalists at the 1984 Summer Paralympics
Medalists at the 1988 Summer Paralympics
Medalists at the 1992 Summer Paralympics
Medalists at the 1996 Summer Paralympics
ITF World Champions
Sportspeople from North Brabant